Aaryan Banthia (born 12 February 1994) is an Indian singer-guitarist, composer and record producer presently based in Mumbai, and linked with the Zee Music Company for his latest releases. He released his first single "Yaadein'" the year in October 2019.

Biography 
Banthia was born12 February 1994 in Kolkata, West Bengal. At age 14, his father bought him an Indian made Hobner acoustic Guitar. He from Cardiff Metropolitan University in Wales, where he began performing as a singer at university venues. He then decided to become a professional musician.

After returning to India, Banthia released his first single "Yaadein" with Zee Music Company. The song gained more than one million views on YouTube. His latest single release is "Back in the Day".

References

Living people
1994 births
Indian singer-songwriters
Indian guitarists
People from Kolkata
Cardiff Metropolitan University